We Can Be Heroes may refer to:

Film and TV
We Can Be Heroes (film), a 2020 film directed by Robert Rodriguez
We Can Be Heroes: Finding the Australian of the Year, an Australian mockumentary TV series
"We Can Be Heroes" (Supergirl), an episode of Supergirl
"We Can Be Heroes" (Orange Is the New Black), an episode of Orange Is the New Black

Other
"Heroes" (David Bowie song), contains the lyric "We Can Be Heroes"

See also
We Could Be Heroes
"Heroes (We Could Be)"